Col. Edward Cook House is a historic home located at Washington Township, Fayette County, Pennsylvania, USA. It was built between 1772 and 1776, and is a two-story, four bay, rectangular stone dwelling with a one-story kitchen wing. The main block measures 36 feet by 28 feet and the kitchen wing 24 feet by 20 feet. It has a medium-pitched gable roof and plain cornice with return. Also on the property are a contributing smoke house and wash house.

It was added to the National Register of Historic Places in 1978.

References

External links

Houses on the National Register of Historic Places in Pennsylvania
Historic American Buildings Survey in Pennsylvania
Houses completed in 1776
Houses in Fayette County, Pennsylvania
National Register of Historic Places in Fayette County, Pennsylvania